Acisoma is a small genus of dragonflies in the family Libellulidae.

Species
It contains six species:

References

External links

Libellulidae
Taxa named by Jules Pierre Rambur
Anisoptera genera
Taxonomy articles created by Polbot